Adam Is Eve (French: Adam est... Ève) is a 1954 French comedy film directed by René Gaveau and starring Michèle Carvel, Jean Carmet and Thérèse Dorny. It is based on  1952 novel of the same name and was the first French film that covered sex change.

Synopsis
Charles Beaumont is finishing his national service and is engaged to be married. After taking part in a boxing match he increasingly feels strange sensations and goes to consult a doctor. He is transformed into Charlotte, a young woman, and unwilling to tell his family or fiancée he disappears and earns a living dancing in a nude cabaret show.

Cast
 Michèle Carvel as Charles / Charlotte Beaumont
 Jean Carmet as Gaston
 Thérèse Dorny as Mme Beaumont
 Mireille Perrey as Mme Corinne
 Antoine Balpêtré as Dr. Charman 
 Anouk Ferjac as Claire
 Antoinette Moya as Adeline Beaumont
 Robert Lombard as 	Alphonse
 Robert Rocca as Léon
 Gilbert Guiraud as Lucien 	
 René Blancard as M Beaumont
 Jean Tissier as M Lapopie
 Georges Bever as Le garçon
 Fransined as Le brigadier
 Claire Gérard as La concierge	
 François Joux as La pâte brisée
 Michel Nastorg as Le maître d'hôtel
 André Numès Fils as Le commissaire 
 René Berthier as Le portier

References

Bibliography
Goble, Alan. The Complete Index to Literary Sources in Film. Walter de Gruyter, 1999.

External links
 

1954 films
1954 comedy films
French comedy films
1950s French-language films
Films directed by René Gaveau
Films based on French novels
1950s French films